Vukašinović (Cyrillic script: Вукашиновић) is a Bosnian, Croat, Montenegrin and Serb surname derived from a masculine given name Vukašin. Notable people with the surname include:

Darko Vukašinović (born 1985), Montenegrin footballer
Marko Vukašinović (born 1993), Montenegrin volleyball player 
Milan Vukašinović (born 1982), Serbian footballer 
Milić Vukašinović (born 1950), Bosnian and Yugoslavian musician from Sarajevo
Miloš Vukašinović, Serbian diplomat from Bosnia and Herzegovina
Miroslav Vukašinović (born 1948), Serbian footballer and manager
Sanja Vukašinović (born 1997), Serbian sports shooter 
Srdjan Vukašinović (born 1983), accordionist of Serbian-Swiss origin
Theo Vukašinović (born 1996), English rugby union lock

References 

Bosnian surnames
Serbian surnames
Montenegrin surnames
Croatian surnames
Patronymic surnames
Surnames from given names